Los unos y los otros is an Argentine talk show TV program. It was hosted by Andrea Politti from 2011 to 2013 and Oscar González Oro since 2014, and aired by América TV since 2009.

Awards
 2013 Martín Fierro Awards: Best female TV host

References

Argentine television talk shows
América TV original programming
2011 Argentine television series debuts